Semmanur is a village in Salem District in Tamil Nadu, India.

In popular culture 
In the film Kaavalan (2011), Bhoominathan (Vijay) and Ammavasai (Vadivelu) come to Semmanur because Muthuramalingam (Rajkiran) lives there.

References

Villages in Salem district